In British media, a reverse ferret is a sudden reversal in an organisation's editorial or political line on a certain issue. Generally, this will involve no acknowledgement of the previous position.

The term originates from Kelvin MacKenzie's time at The Sun. His preferred description of the role of journalists when it came to public figures was to "stick a ferret up their trousers". This meant making their lives uncomfortable and was based on the supposed Northern England stunt of ferret-legging (where contestants compete to show who can endure a live ferret within their sealed trousers the longest). When it became clear that the tide of public opinion had turned against the paper's line, MacKenzie would burst from his office shouting "Reverse ferret!"  The phrase moved into general usage after it became a catchphrase in Private Eye magazine, initially in its 'Street of Shame' section but which quickly spread throughout its more satirical pages.

In 2014, the Mayor of New York performed a literal reverse ferret when he repealed a ban on owning domesticated ferrets within the city. Republican leaders' affirmation of support for Donald Trump—hitherto derided by Republicans competing with him for nomination as Republican presidential candidate—in October 2016 was described as a reverse ferret by The New York Times. The phrase was used in the UK Parliament at about 17:15 on 28 March 2019 by Mary Creagh in a debate relating to the Government's last-ditch defence of the UK's withdrawal deal with the EU, which had stalled in Parliament through lack of support.

BBC political editor Laura Kuenssberg used the phrase on Twitter on 11 November 2019, when describing the action of Brexit Party leader, Nigel Farage, in standing down all the party's potential candidates in the December 2019 UK General Election who were to contest seats won by Conservatives in the 2017 UK General Election.

Boris Johnson, Prime Minister of the United Kingdom, used the phrase in an interview on 13 February 2021, when discussing the easing of England's third national lockdown. He used it while explaining that any steps taken must be taken carefully to avoid a "reverse ferret", suggesting the return of those measures.

References

Ferrets
Journalism terminology
Metaphors referring to animals
Metaphors referring to sport